The divisions of Punjab, are the first-order administrative bodies of the Punjab Province of Pakistan. In total, there are 11 divisions, which are further divided into districts ranging from three to six per division, depending upon area. Divisions are governed by Commissioners while districts are governed by Deputy Commissioners.

History
Administrative divisions had formed an integral tier of government from the times of Mughal Empire and latterly British Raj. The Lahore and Multan Subahs (combinedly Punjab)  during Mughal era while Punjab Province during British era were subdivided into divisions, which were themselves subdivided into districts.

After independence, The province of West Punjab had four divisions – Lahore, Multan, Rawalpindi and Sargodha. From 1955 to 1970, during One Unit policy the Princely State of Bahawalpur was joined with West Punjab and made part of Bahawalpur Division. In the late 1970s new divisions were formed; Gujranwala Division was formed from parts of Lahore and Rawalpindi divisions; Dera Ghazi Khan Division was split from Multan Division; Faisalabad Division was split from Sargodha Division and, with the passage of time, the number of these divisions increased and now there are nine divisions.on 17 August 2022, Gujarat Division established in Punjab Province.

On January 14, 2023, Mianwali Division was added to Punjab Province.

Administration
Every division of province is divided into many districts and then further into tehsils. Each division is administrated by a commissioner. He is assisted by different deputy commissioners of all districts of his division. The duties of commissioner according to Punjab Government Act 2013 (XVIII of 2013) are as follows:

 He is the officer-in-charge of general administration and principal representative of the government in the division.
 He monitors the discharge of duties by the deputy commissioners in the division.
 He is also responsible to facilitate and coordinate any work which concerns two or more districts in the division.

List of divisions

References

P